"Metal And Hair" by Indie rock band The Mess Hall was the second single released from their ARIA award-winning album Notes From A Ceiling. It is the seventh song on the album.

The limited edition digipak single also features a CD-ROM of the Triple J favourite Lock & Load live from The Annandale Hotel

External links
Shock Records
Waterfront Records
HMV Australia

2005 singles
2005 songs